A quincunx originally meant a 5/12 fraction of something, but most modern uses involve patterns of five points. "Quincunx" or "quincuncial" may also refer to:

Geometric patterns of points
Quincunx, five points, four in a square with one more in the middle of the square.
An orchard planted in a square lattice aligned diagonally to the surrounding plot of land
Quincunx matrix, a 2×2 Hadamard matrix that generates points in a diagonal lattice pattern
Bean machine, also called a quincunx, a machine designed by Sir Francis Galton to demonstrate normal distributions, consisting of an array of pins in a diagonal lattice pattern
Quincuncial map, a method of mapping the globe onto a square so that the poles map to the five points of a quincunx
Place des Quinconces, a city square in Bordeaux, France, named for the quincunx pattern in which its trees were planted
Rhombic lattice, the points of intersection of two families of equally spaced parallel lines, called a quincunx In 19th-century mathematics

Literature
The Garden of Cyrus or The Quincunciall Lozenge, a 1658 philosophical treatise by Sir Thomas Browne concerning interconnections in art and science involving the number five and the quincunx pattern
Mistress Masham's Repose, a 1946 novel by T. H. White in which a lake in the grounds of Maria's estate is called the Quincunx
The Quincunx of Time, a 1973 science fiction novel by James Blish; the title refers to an orchard in the Academy of Plato, planted in a quincunx pattern
The Avignon Quintet, a set of five novels that its author, Lawrence Durrell, described as forming a quincunx; the fifth, Quinx (1985), has a plot that includes the discovery of a stone quincunx pattern
The Quincunx, a 1989 novel by Charles Palliser that traces five related families over five generations
The Quincunx Cycle, a series of novels begun in 2014 written by Canadian author André Alexis

Biology
Quincuncial aestivation, an arrangement of five parts of a flower bud prior to opening found in some plants
Quincuncina, a genus of freshwater mussels named for the pattern of nodules on its shells

Other uses
Quincunx (Roman coin), a bronze coin with the value of 5/12 of an as
Quincunx (astrology), an angle of 150°, 5/12 of a complete circle